GalleryBeat TV was a public access television show covering the art scene in New York City from 1993 to 2003. The show was hosted by Paul Hasegawa-Overacker (also known as Paul H-O). The show, which produced over 130 episodes, covered art openings in Manhattan art galleries by speaking with gallery-goers and talking to artists, including Julian Schnabel, who said on camera that the show was "idiotic." The show also featured cooking segments, an interview with The New York Times art critic Roberta Smith, Brice Marden, Spencer Tunick, recorded street protests by the Guerrilla Girls and a visit to  the Gramercy Art Fair. The show was noted for having "a gonzo, nobody’s-watching-anyway spirit" and one of the goals of GalleryBeat TV was to question the art beyond "whatever’s in the press release." New York artist Walter Robinson was also a correspondent for the show.

Documentary 
The show was turned into a documentary film made in 2008 called Guest of Cindy Sherman, where Paul H-O documents his life as the boyfriend of New York artist Cindy Sherman. The film has been called "a requiem for a time before big money ruined the art world."

References 

1993 American television series debuts
2003 American television series endings
1990s American documentary television series
2000s American documentary television series